An original net animation (ONA), known in Japan as , is an anime that is directly released onto the Internet. ONAs may also have been aired on television if they were first directly released on the Internet. The name mirrors original video animation, a term that has been used in the anime industry for straight-to-video animation since the early 1980s. The Internet is a relatively new outlet for animation distribution that has been made viable by the increasing number of streaming media websites in Japan.

A growing number of trailers and preview episodes of new anime have been released as ONA. For example, the anime movie of Megumi can be considered an ONA. ONAs have the tendency to be shorter than traditional anime titles, sometimes running only a few minutes. There are many examples of an original net animation, such as Hetalia: Axis Powers, which only last a few minutes per episode. But while that was true for the beginning of the 2010s, this began to change in the second half of the decade as full series began to be licensed exclusively for streaming services like Netflix, Amazon Prime Video and Disney+.

The majority of the production of animation in Japan is made for television or for other audio-visual formats, which include ONAs that can be viewed on television, mobile devices or computers.

See also

 Original video animation
 Webisode

References

Anime and manga terminology
 
Web animation
New media
Internet-based works
Multimedia